Sister Anne Carr (11 November 1934 – 11 February 2008) was a Catholic nun, a Sister of Charity of the Blessed Virgin Mary, an activist, and feminist theologian at the University of Chicago Divinity School, where she was the first female permanent member of the faculty. She was well known for her beliefs regarding feminism and seen as an advocate for women's rights. Carr specialized in feminism theology regarding Catholic thought and during her lifetime she wrote ground breaking books which examined feminism and Christianity.

Education 
Her bachelor's degree was from Mundelein College and she also held a master's degree in theology from Marquette University. She received a master's degree and her doctorate from the University of Chicago in 1971 with a dissertation on the German theologian Karl Rahner, and began teaching there in 1975. She also held several honorary doctorates. Her books include Thomas Merton's Theology of Self and Transforming Grace: Christian Tradition and Women's Experience.

Beliefs 
Carr's opinions on the church were considered controversial, especially as she critiqued the modern shortcomings of the Church while still remaining a devoted nun to Catholicism. During her life as a practicing Catholic woman, Anne Carr contributed multiple literature pieces regarding feminist theology that dealt with links between traditional Catholic values and feminism. What many believed was a radical approach at the time, Carr did not hold back when she discussed the sexism that existed in the Christian community.

She was amongst a group of twenty some nuns in the United States who were part of an extremely provocative New York Times advertisement that helped to relinquish the belief that all Roman Catholics regard abortion as a sin and share the same views on it. Anne Carr was also an advocate for the ordination of women in the Catholic Church. She repeatedly called upon religious men and women to understand it is possible to remain devoted to the Church while simultaneously understanding traditions can, and sometimes need to, be reevaluated.

Bibliography 
 Thomas Merton's Theology of Self 
 Transforming Grace: Christian Tradition and Women's Experience
 Is a Christian Feminist Theology Possible?

References

External links 
Obituary from the Chicago Tribune
Obituary from the Sisters of Charity of the Blessed Virgin Mary
Anne Carr and Bono

20th-century American Roman Catholic theologians
Women Christian theologians
1934 births
2008 deaths